Demetris Christofi (born 28 September 1988) is a Cypriot professional footballer who plays as a winger for Cypriot club Anorthosis Famagusta.

Career
Christofi is a winger who also plays as a centre-forward or second striker. He is highly regarded for his strong shot. He was considered one of the most promising young players in Cyprus. His transfer from Enosis Neon Paralimni to Omonia was the most expensive transfer in the history of Cypriot football, reaching a reported cost of €1 million.

On 31 May 2017, Omonia announced the renewal of Christofi's contract until 2021.

On 31 January 2020, Anorthosis sign with Christofi until 2021.

Career statistics

International
Scores and results list Cyprus' goal tally first.

Honours
AC Omonia
Cypriot First Division: 2009–10
Cypriot Cup: 2010–11, 2011–12
Cypriot Super Cup: 2010, 2012

FC Sion
Swiss Cup:  2014–15

References

External links
 

1988 births
Living people
Association football wingers
Cypriot footballers
Cyprus international footballers
Cypriot First Division players
Swiss Super League players
Enosis Neon Paralimni FC players
AC Omonia players
FC Sion players
Onisilos Sotira players
Cyprus under-21 international footballers
Cypriot expatriate footballers
Cypriot expatriate sportspeople in Switzerland
Expatriate footballers in Switzerland